Richard William Simcott (born 27 January 1977) is a hyperpolyglot who lives in Skopje, North Macedonia. He speaks 16 languages fluently. HarperCollins referred to him as "One of the most multilingual people from the United Kingdom". Besides the languages that he exhibits fluency in, he has also actively studied more than 50 languages at some point in his career.

Background
Simcott was born in England, with English as his first language, quickly learning French at a young age. He grew up in the English Wales Border districts so he learnt Welsh as well. His father remarried a Thai woman, so he started to learn Thai on some trips there as a teenager. Since that time he has learned a range of languages including Turkish, Polish, Hebrew, Chinese, Icelandic, Macedonian and Esperanto. Simcott has worked with languages in the UK diplomatic service, he has been a production manager for Emoderation as well as being the languages director for Polpea. He has also hosted a range of Polyglot conferences internationally, and is the current head of the Polyglot Conference. He was interviewed by 16×9 for a short television programme about polyglots. Simcott runs his own blog Speaking Fluently and has published a book on French Short Stories. In 2015, the Goethe Institut named him Ambassador for Multilingualism.

Language abilities
He is regarded as a proficient polyglot in the UK. Simcott can learn languages in very short periods of time, and has passed C1 Fluency exams after 3 months of study . According to his profile on LinkedIn, he is proclaiming native level command in English, French, German, Spanish, Dutch and Macedonian. He can speak about 30 languages in total to some degree. Simcott continues to study languages in a university environment, which differs from other polyglots.

References

External links

1977 births
Linguists from the United Kingdom
Living people